Bybee Pottery was a pottery company based in Bybee, a community in Madison County, Kentucky, USA. It was founded in 1809 by Webster Cornelison and members of the same Cornelison family continued to make and sell pottery until 2011. Bybee Pottery sold a wide variety of products and encouraged customers to interact with the artisans and tour the building that had survived six generations and the Civil War.

Located in a vernacular structure with the appearance of a barn, Bybee Pottery was considered the oldest pottery operation in the United States west of the Appalachian Mountains. Employees procured the yellow clay from a nearby source close to the banks of the Kentucky River.

The pottery's earliest years are undocumented; the earliest clear references to the facility are sales records from 1845, but even this date demonstrates that Cornelison is Madison County's oldest industry.  Pottery was first thrown at Cornelison by a local farmer, James Eli Cornelison, who observed that his farm contained substantial amounts of high-quality clay that was ready for industrial purposes without any preparation. A family cousin, Ron Stambaugh, owned a retail outlet that sold Bybee pottery among other items under the name, A Little Bit of Bybee.

The pottery facility was listed on the National Register of Historic Places in 1978 as Cornelison Pottery. The fifth and sixth generations of the Cornelison family in the business continued to operate the pottery on a commercial basis.

In February 2011, Bybee Pottery laid off its eight remaining employees, sold off remaining in-store inventory, and suspended operations. While it was neither producing nor selling products at the time, the owners stated that there was product formed that could be fired.  new pieces were still being produced, but at a much smaller rate, and sold out of a new shop in Middletown, Kentucky.

References

External links
 Little Bit of Bybee (Retailer) 

American companies established in 1809
1809 establishments in Kentucky
Tourist attractions in Madison County, Kentucky
Ceramics manufacturers of the United States
Industrial buildings and structures on the National Register of Historic Places in Kentucky
Industrial buildings completed in 1845
Manufacturing companies based in Kentucky
National Register of Historic Places in Madison County, Kentucky